ToonSeum: Pittsburgh Museum of Cartoon Art is a museum devoted exclusively to the cartoon arts, located in Pittsburgh, Pennsylvania. ToonSeum is one of three museums dedicated to cartoon art in the United States. ToonSeum moved to its own gallery space on Liberty Avenue in Pittsburgh's downtown Cultural District on November 8, 2009, aided by the Pittsburgh Cultural Trust. It is currently led by John Kelly.

In 2009, the ToonSeum established its NEMO Award, given to notable individuals "for excellence in the cartoon arts". Recipients to date include veteran comic-book artist Ron Frenz, editorial and comic-strip artist Dick Locher, and comics artist, editorial cartoonist and artists' rights advocate Jerry Robinson. In May 2013, ToonSeum hosted the two-day North American Conference of the National Cartoonists Society.  In that same month, plans for expansion of the museum were announced.

On February 16, 2018, the ToonSeum announced on their Facebook page that they would close the physical location on Liberty avenue February 24, 2018 to focus on direct community outreach.

See also 

 Funky Turns 40: Black Character Revolution

References

External links
 

Art museums and galleries in Pennsylvania
Cartooning museums
Mass media museums in the United States
Museums in Pittsburgh
Art museums established in 2007
2007 establishments in Pennsylvania